Paul Sliter (May 5, 1969 – August 15, 2001) was an American politician and businessman who served as a member of the Montana House of Representatives for the 76th district from 1994 until 2001.

Early life and education 
Sliter was born in Kalispell, Montana, and graduated from Flathead County High School in 1987. He received his bachelor's degree in political science from University of Montana in 1996. As a college student, Sliter served as an intern in the office of Senator Conrad Burns.

Career 
Sliter worked as the sales and credit manager at the Sliter's Ace Lumber and Building Supply in Bigfork, Montana. Sliter served in the Montana House of Representatives from 1994 until his death in 2001. A Republican, he also served as House majority leader.

Personal life 
Sliter lived with his wife and family in Somers, Montana. He died in a car accident near Marysville, Montana.

References

1969 births
2001 deaths
Politicians from Kalispell, Montana
University of Montana alumni
Businesspeople from Montana
Republican Party members of the Montana House of Representatives
Road incident deaths in Montana
20th-century American politicians
20th-century American businesspeople